The 1929 Temple Owls football team was an American football team that represented Temple University as an independent during the 1929 college football season. In its fifth season under head coach Heinie Miller, the team compiled a 6–3–1 record and shut out six of its ten opponents. The team played its home games at Temple Stadium in Philadelphia.

Schedule

References

Temple
Temple Owls football seasons
Temple Owls football